is a Japanese writer.

He resides in Ōita Prefecture and is associate professor at the Rikkyo University. He was awarded the 152nd Akutagawa Prize (for 2014, presented in 2015), for the novel 9 Nen Mae no Inori ("A Prayer Nine Years Ago").

Works in Translation
Novels
 , translated by Angus Turvill, Two Lines Press, 2020. 
 , translated by Angus Turvill, Two Lines Press, 2018. 

Short Stories
 
 A breast, translated by Juliet Winters Carpenter, in At the edge of the wood, Strangers Press, 2017. 
 A breast, translated by Juliet Winters Carpenter, in At the edge of the woods, Two Lines Press, 2022. 
 
 The pastry shop at the edge of the wood, translated by Juliet Winters Carpenter, in At the edge of the wood, Strangers Press, 2017. 
 The cake shop in the woods, translated by Juliet Winters Carpenter, in At the edge of the woods, Two Lines Press, 2022. 
 
 The old leather bag, translated by Juliet Winters Carpenter, in At the edge of the woods, Two Lines Press, 2022. 
 
 The dosing gnarl, translated by Juliet Winters Carpenter, in At the edge of the woods, Two Lines Press, 2022.

References

1970 births
Living people
Japanese writers
Akutagawa Prize winners
People from Ōita Prefecture
Academic staff of Rikkyo University